Mauck's Meetinghouse, also known as Mill Creek Church, is a historic Mennonite-Baptist meeting house located at Hamburg, Page County, Virginia. It was built between 1795 and 1800, and is a -story, planked-log structure measuring approximately 36 feet by 29 feet. The building was remodeled about 1830, with the addition of weatherboard siding (since removed) and interior balconies. The entrances feature raised six-panel Federal doors and the architrave is a simple one-section molding.

It was listed on the National Register of Historic Places in 1976.

Mauck's Meetinghouse is owned by the Page County Heritage Association and is open the first Saturday of the month from May through September.

References

External links
 PCHA Museums - Page County Heritage Association

Churches on the National Register of Historic Places in Virginia
Religious buildings and structures completed in 1800
Federal architecture in Virginia
Buildings and structures in Page County, Virginia
National Register of Historic Places in Page County, Virginia
Museums in Page County, Virginia
Religious museums in Virginia